Merrell Vories Hitotsuyanagi (born William Merrell Vories; October 28, 1880 – May 7, 1964) was an educator, architect, entrepreneur, Christian lay missionary, and founder of the Omi Mission. Born in the United States, he later became a naturalized Japanese citizen.

Merrell lived and worked mainly in Shiga Prefecture in Japan. With only limited formal training as an architect, he founded an architectural office in Shiga which employed over thirty professional staff and was responsible for the design of well over 1000 residential, commercial, and church structures in Japan and occupied Korea, prior to the Second World War.

Biography
Vories was born in Leavenworth, Kansas in 1880. He graduated from Colorado College in 1904. At first, he hoped to be an architect, although he came to Japan in 1905 as an English-language teacher, with an intention to engage in Christian missionary work. While working as a teacher in Omihachiman, Shiga Prefecture, in 1908 he was dismissed from teaching job because his Bible Classes had attracted over one third of his class among others who were aligned with local Buddhist temples.
Vories had been asked to inspect the construction of an Omihachiman YMCA office building in 1907, which became his first work as an architect in Japan. He opened his office for architectural design in 1908 and in the following year, he founded "Vories & Co." along with Lester Chapin, an architect, and Etsuzō Yoshida, his English class student. They held it initially in Kyoto and moved to Ōmihachiman to accommodate for their success.

Through YMCA activities in Japan, Vories became acquainted with many American and Japanese people, and received numerous commissions to design houses, churches, schools, hospitals, and YMCA facilities near and far. As many as 1,600 buildings can be credited to Vories' designs.

In 1918, he founded the Omi Mission, and devoted his efforts to Christian missionary work and education.

In 1919, Vories married the daughter of viscount Suenori Hitotsuyanagi, .

He established Omi Sales Company in 1920, to promote an ointment called Mentholatum to earn funds to support his missionary work.

Vories also loved music, and is credited with introducing the Hammond Organ into Japan. The collective of schools which were founded by the Omi Brotherhood, known as Vories Gakuen, maintain usage of the Hammond organs supplied by Vories.

In 1941, just before the attack on Pearl Harbor, Vories was naturalized as a Japanese citizen and took the name of Mereru Hitotsuyanagi as required by the Japanese law, pledged his allegiance to the nation of Japan and to the Emperor Hirohito.

In September 1945, the former Prime Minister Fumimaro Konoe asked Vories to convey a message to SCAP on the Emperor's behalf. Vories also shared the idea of the Emperor renouncing claims of divinity and declaring his humanity. He would later go on to meet the Emperor four times.

Death
In 1957, Vories suffered a stroke while he was in his summer home in Karuizawa, Nagano Prefecture and was transported back to Ōmihachiman for medical treatment. He remained bedridden for seven years and died on the second floor of his house on May 7, 1964, at the age of 83.

In 1958, Vories was awarded as the first Honorary Citizen of Omihachiman. He was posthumously honored the Order of the Sacred Treasure, 3rd class, by the Japanese government. His house in Ōmihachiman was currently the "Vories Commemorative Museum".

Notes

References

Books

 "ヴォーリズの建築―ミッション・ユートピアと都市の華" 山形 政昭  1989 
 "ヴォーリズの西洋館―日本近代住宅の先駆" 山形 政昭 2002 
 "ウィリアム・メレル・ヴォーリズ―写真集 日本人を越えたニホン人" 山田プランニング 1998 
 "ヴォーリズ建築の100年―恵みの居場所をつくる" 2008 
 "ヴォーリズ評伝―日本で隣人愛を実践したアメリカ人" 奥村直彦 2005 
 "青い目の近江商人メレル・ヴォーリズ―創業者精神「信仰と商売の両立の実践」を受け継いで" 岩原 侑 1997 
 "青い目の近江商人ヴォーリズ外伝―「信仰と事業の両立」を果たした師ゆかりの地を歩いて" 岩原 侑 2002

External links
 
 "W.M.Vories & Company Architects Ichiryusha"s official site
 Vories Commemorative Museum home page
 William Merrell Vories, Omihachiman Tourism Association
 William Merrell Vories (Merrel Hitotsuyanagi)｜Omi Brotherhood Schools

1880 births
1964 deaths
20th-century American architects
American expatriates in Japan
Protestant missionaries in Japan
Teachers of English as a second or foreign language
Architecture in Japan
Naturalized citizens of Japan
People from Leavenworth, Kansas

American Protestant missionaries
Japanese Protestants
Japanese people of American descent